The Gifted One is a 1989 American fantasy television film that aired on NBC on June 25, 1989.

Plot
A young boy has the capability to use his body energy to heal people. He runs away from the scientists studying him in order to learn about his past and discover how he came to have this ability.

Cast

 Peter Kowanko as Michael Grant
 John Rhys-Davies as Carl Boardman
 G. W. Bailey as Dr. Winslow
 Wendy Phillips as Sarah Grant
 Gregg Henry as Jack
 Kristopher Kent Hill as Billy Farady
 James Eric as Tom Farady
 Shano Palovich as Beth Farady
 Lucky Hayes as Mrs. Williams
 Charles Benton as Mr. Williams
 Dey Young as Susan Martin
 Dale Swann as Gordon Thomas
 Rose Weaver as Dr. Claire Henry
 Stephen Hastings as Dr. Hart
 Jim Newcomer as Dr. James
 Spensley Schroder as Dr. Solomon
 Kenneth Bridges as Dr. Helfen
 Doughlas Cotner as Dr. Richards
 Anthony Bolden as Technician
 Mason Arnold as Tommy
 Chris Balcerzak as Johnny
 Larry Bartels as Baseball Player
 Arell Blanton as Guard
 Brandon Call as Michael (age 10)
 Thomas Callaway as John Grant
 Cole Coxon as Baby Michael
 Joe El Rady as Frankie
 Jackson Douglas Fischer as Doctor
 Tami French as Hannah
 Sanford Gibbons as Policeman #1
 Khrystyne Haje as Mary Joe
 Christina Herczeg as Little Girl (Carol)
 Hank Lawrence as Big Lou
 Chris Livesay as Bobby
 Michael Mancini as Umpire
 Mark Manning as Principal
 Norm McBride as Coach
 Christopher Michael as Bobby
 Emily Ragsdale as Nurse
 Steven Suggs as Jeffrey
 Joanthan Voyce as Policeman #2

Broadcast
The film aired on NBC at 9:00 p.m. on Sunday, June 25, 1989.

References

External links
 

1989 television films
1989 films
American fantasy films
American television films
Fantasy television films
Films directed by Stephen Herek
Films scored by J. Peter Robinson
Films about children
1980s American films